Union Mills or Roy's Mills are a Grade II listed combined tower mill and watermill at Burnham Overy, Norfolk, England which has been  converted to residential accommodation.

History

The watermill was built in 1737, this date being recorded on the watermill. As originally built, it was a two-storey mill. Thomas Beeston was the miller in 1802. The windmill was built in 1814 and bears a tablet inscribed T. B. 1814 PEACE, referring to the banishment of Napoleon to Elba in that year. The watermill was probably raised by a storey at this date. The mills were offered for sale by auction at the Norfolk Hotel, Norwich on 3 August 1825. The windmill was described as having five floors and the Patent sails had shutters made of copper. The mills were not sold. James Read took them, and worked them until his death in 1864. William Love Porritt, the son-in-law of James Read then took the mills. The mills were offered for sale by auction at the Hoste Arms Inn, Burnham Market on 13 July 1870. They were then being let to Porritt at an annual rental of £225. In 1893, the windmill was dismantled and the watermill fitted out with roller milling machinery.

In 1896, the mills had a steam engine as auxiliary power. This had been replaced by a gas engine by 1925. In May 1935, the mill tower was burnt out in a fire. The tower was refitted, and the former conical roof replaced with two cowled ventilators. An oil engine was the auxiliary power source in 1937. The mills were still in use at this time but had ceased working by 1969. In 1999 the mills were purchased for conversion. A new ogee cap was constructed and fitted to the windmill tower.

Description

The windmill is a six-storey tower mill with an ogee cap which has a gallery. There is a stage at third-floor level. The mill had four double Patent sails carried on a cast-iron windshaft. The windmill drove two pairs of French Burr millstones, and was also capable of driving the three pairs of French Burr millstones in the watermill.

The watermill is a three-storey brick building with a roof of pantiles. It is powered by an undershot Poncelet waterwheel made by Whitmore & Binyon, the Wickham Market, Suffolk, millwrights.

Millers
Thomas Beeston 1802-25
James Read 1830-64
William Love Porritt 1865-1900
Philip Roy 1904-22
Philip Roy & Sons Ltd 1925-37
Sidney Roy 1953

References for above:-

References

External links
Windmill World webpage on Union Mills.

Windmills in Norfolk
Tower mills in the United Kingdom
Grinding mills in the United Kingdom
Commercial buildings completed in 1737
Windmills completed in 1814
Grade II listed buildings in Norfolk
Grade II listed windmills
Watermills in Norfolk